The Italy women's national field hockey team represents Italy in international field hockey competitions. The team is currently ranked 17th in the FIH World Rankings, with 623 points.

History
Field hockey was first introduced in Italy in 1935, and has since grown in popularity within the country.

In July 2017, at the 2016–17 Hockey World League Semifinals in Brussels, Belgium, the Italian women's team secured qualification for the 2018 Hockey World Cup. This is the first major international tournament Italy have qualified for since the 1976 Hockey World Cup, where the team finished 10th.

Tournament history

Current roster
The following 18 players were named in the Italian squad for the 2022 FIH Nations Cup in Valencia.

Head coach:  Robert Justus

References

External links
Official website
FIH profile

Field hockey
Nationla team
European women's national field hockey teams